Chronos ("time"), also spelled Khronos or Chronus, is a personification of time in pre-Socratic philosophy and later literature.

Chronos is frequently confused with, or perhaps consciously identified with, the Titan Cronus in antiquity due to the similarity in names. The identification became more widespread during the Renaissance, giving rise to the iconography of Father Time wielding the harvesting scythe.

Greco-Roman mosaics depicted Chronos as a man turning the zodiac wheel. He is comparable to the deity Aion as a symbol of cyclical time. He is usually portrayed as an old callous man with a thick grey beard, personifying the destructive and stifling aspects of time.

Name

During antiquity, Chronos was occasionally interpreted as Cronus. According to Plutarch, the Greeks believed that Cronus was an allegorical name for Chronos.

Mythology
In the Orphic tradition, the unaging Chronos was "engendered" by "earth and water", and produced Aether, Chaos, and an egg. The egg produced the hermaphroditic god Phanes who gave birth to the first generation of gods and is the ultimate creator of the cosmos.

Pherecydes of Syros in his lost  ("The seven recesses"), around 6th century BC, claimed that there were three eternal principles: Chronos, Zas (Zeus) and Chthonie (the chthonic). The semen of Chronos was placed in the recesses of the Earth and produced the first generation of gods.

Notes

References
 Beekes, S. P., Etymological Dictionary of Greek, 2 vols. Leiden: Brill, 2009.
 Delaere, Mark, Unfolding Time: Studies in Temporality in Twentieth-century Music, Leuven University Press, 2009. .
 Kirk, G. S., J. E. Raven, M. Schofield. The Presocratic Philosophers: A Critical History with a Selection of Texts. Cambridge University Press; 2 edition (February 24, 1984). .
 Liddell, Henry George, Robert Scott. A Greek-English Lexicon, revised and augmented throughout by Sir Henry Stuart Jones with the assistance of Roderick McKenzie, Clarendon Press Oxford, 1940. Online version at the Perseus Digital Library.
 Levi, Doro, "Aion," Hesperia 13.4 (1944).
 Macey, Samuel L., Encyclopedia of Time, Routledge. .
 Plutarch, Moralia, Volume V: Isis and Osiris. The E at Delphi. The Oracles at Delphi No Longer Given in Verse. The Obsolescence of Oracles. Translated by Frank Cole Babbitt. Loeb Classical Library No. 306. Cambridge, MA: Harvard University Press, 1936. . Online version at Harvard University Press.
 West, M. L. (1983), The Orphic Poems, Clarendon Press. .

Greek gods
Greek primordial deities
Personifications in Greek mythology
Personifications
Time and fate gods